McCatty is a surname. Notable people with the surname include:

Grace McCatty (born 1989), English footballer
Odain McCatty (born 1996), Jamaican cricketer
Steve McCatty (born 1954), American baseball player and coach